Purfleet railway station is on the London, Tilbury and Southend line serving the town of Purfleet, Essex. Its three-letter station code is PFL.

It was opened in 1854 by the London Tilbury and Southend Railway and initially trains ran from Tilbury to Stratford where the train split for either Spitalfields or Fenchurch Street. The station and all trains serving it are currently operated by c2c. Although outside London fare zone 6, the station became part of the Oyster card pay-as-you-go network in 2010.

Services 

The typical off-peak service frequency is:

 2 trains per hour (tph) westbound to London Fenchurch Street;

During peak times there are additional services including some connecting to other sections of the line beyond Grays.

References

External links

Railway stations in Essex
DfT Category D stations
Transport in Thurrock
Former London, Tilbury and Southend Railway stations
Railway stations in Great Britain opened in 1854
Railway stations served by c2c
Railway station